The 2015 Richmond Raiders season was the sixth season for the American indoor football franchise, and their fourth in the Professional Indoor Football League (PIFL).

Schedule
Key:

Regular season
All start times are local to home team

Standings

Postseason

Roster

References

Richmond Raiders
VCU Rams Virginia
Richmond Raiders